Mohamed Husain Bahzad (born 31 July 1980) is a Bahraini football defender.

International career
He is also a member of the Bahrain national football team, and played for the squad at the 1997 FIFA U-17 World Championship in Egypt.

National team career statistics

Goals for senior national team

Honours

Club
Al Nassr
Saudi Professional League (2): 2013–14, 2014–15
Saudi Crown Prince Cup (1): 2013–14

See also 
 List of men's footballers with 100 or more international caps

External links

1980 births
Living people
Bahraini footballers
Association football defenders
Bahrain international footballers
Bahraini people of Iranian descent
Expatriate footballers in Kuwait
Expatriate footballers in Qatar
Expatriate footballers in Saudi Arabia
Bahraini expatriate sportspeople in Kuwait
Bahraini expatriate sportspeople in Qatar
Al-Najma SC players
Qatar Stars League players
Al-Gharafa SC players
Al-Ahli Saudi FC players
Al Kharaitiyat SC players
Kazma SC players
Qadsia SC players
Al Salmiya SC players
Umm Salal SC players
Al Nassr FC players
Riffa SC players
2004 AFC Asian Cup players
2007 AFC Asian Cup players
2015 AFC Asian Cup players
Footballers at the 2002 Asian Games
Footballers at the 2006 Asian Games
Sportspeople from Manama
FIFA Century Club
Saudi Professional League players
Asian Games competitors for Bahrain
Bahraini expatriate sportspeople in Saudi Arabia
Kuwait Premier League players